Osmia agilis is a species of bee in the genus Osmia and family Megachilidae.   It was first described by Morawitz in 1875. and there is no listed type like this one.

References 

agilis
Insects described in 1875